The Scottish League One, known as cinch League One for sponsorship reasons, is the third tier of the Scottish Professional Football League, the league competition for men's professional football clubs in Scotland. The Scottish League One was established in July 2013, after the Scottish Professional Football League was formed by a merger of the Scottish Premier League and Scottish Football League.

Format
Teams receive three points for a win and one point for a draw. No points are awarded for a loss. Teams are ranked by total points, then goal difference, and then goals scored. At the end of each season, the club with the most points is crowned league champion. If points are equal, the goal difference determines the winner. If this still does not result in a winner, the tied teams must take part in a playoff game at a neutral venue to determine the final placings.

Promotion and relegation
The champions are directly promoted to the Scottish Championship, swapping places with the bottom club of the championship. The clubs finishing 2nd, 3rd, 4th in League One, and the 9th placed team in the Championship then enter the two-legged Championship play-off. The 2nd-placed League One club plays the 3rd-placed League One club, whilst the team who finished 4th in League One will play the 9th-placed Championship side. The winners of these ties will then play each other. If a League One play-off winner prevails, that club is promoted, with the championship club being relegated. If the Championship  side is victorious, they then retain their place in the Championship.

For promotion and relegation, the League One play-off system closely mirrors its
Championship counterpart, in which the bottom club of League One is automatically relegated and the 9th-placed club undergoes a play-off with the 2nd, 3rd and 4th placed clubs from League Two.

Teams
Listed below are all the teams competing in the 2022–23 Scottish League One season, with details of the first season they entered the third tier; the first season of their current spell in the third tier; and the last time they won the third tier.

as Airdrie United

Stadiums

Statistics

Championships

Top goalscorers

 
Italics denotes players still playing football,Bold denotes players still playing in Scottish League One.

Broadcasting rights

Notes

References

External links
Scottish League One – Official website

 
League One
3
2013 establishments in Scotland
Sports leagues established in 2013
Sco
Professional sports leagues in Scotland